A Traffic Operations Practitioner Specialist (TOPS) is a certification sponsored by the Transportation Professional Certification Board, Inc., and promulgated by the Institute of Transportation Engineers.  Prior to taking the required exam, an individual must have at least five years of related working experience, though academic experience may be substituted for this requirement.  Additionally, as the certification is not intended for professionals, licensed professional engineers are not permitted to be a certified TOPS.

Exam
There is a 100-question certification examination.

See also 
Traffic Engineering
Professional Traffic Operations Engineer
Traffic Signal Operations Specialist
Professional Transportation Planner

References 

Professional titles and certifications